The Hunter 306 is an American sailboat design, that was introduced in 2001.

The design forms a scaled series with the Hunter 326 and the 356.

Production
The design was built by Hunter Marine in the United States, starting in 2001, but it is now out of production.

Design

The Hunter 306 is a recreational keelboat, built predominantly of fiberglass. It has a fractional sloop B&R rig, an internally-mounted spade-type rudder and a fixed fin keel. It displaces  and carries  of ballast.

The boat has a PHRF racing average handicap of 186 with a high of 207 and low of 168.

See also

List of sailing boat types

Related development
Hunter 326
Hunter 356

Similar sailboats
Alberg 30
Alberg Odyssey 30
Aloha 30
Annie 30
Bahama 30
Bristol 29.9
C&C 1/2 Ton
C&C 30
C&C 30 Redwing
Catalina 30
Catalina 309
CS 30
Grampian 30
Hunter 29.5
Hunter 30
Hunter 30T
Hunter 30-2
J/30
Kirby 30
Mirage 30
Mirage 30 SX
Nonsuch 30
Pearson 303
S2 9.2
Tanzer 31

References

External links

Official sales brochure

Keelboats
2000s sailboat type designs
Sailing yachts 
Sailboat types built by Hunter Marine